Jean Hamon (2 January 1618 – 22 February 1687) was a French doctor and writer of many works on medical and religious subjects. He was born in Cherbourg. A Jansenist, he taught at the Petites écoles de Port-Royal. He died in Paris.

Published works
 Apologia Patris Cellotii (1648)
 Écrit touchant l’excommunication, composé par M. Hamon, vers l’année 1665, à l’occasion des troubles excités dans l’Église, par rapport au Formulaire, 1665
 Traités de piété, (2 vol, 1675)
 Traitez de morale de S. Augustin pour tous les états qui composent le corps de l’Église, (traduits du latin, 1680)
 Aegrae animae et dolorem suum lenire conantis pia in psalmum centesimum decimum octavum soliloquia (Amsterdam, 1684 ; traduit en français par Fontaine en 1685 et Goujet en 1732)
 Sur la morale et les devoirs des pasteurs (2 vol, 1689)
 Pratique de la prière continuelle ou Sentiments d’une âme vivement touchée de Dieu (1702)
 Explication du Cantique de Cantiques (4 vol, 1708)
 Instruction pour les religieuses de Port-Royal (2 vol, 1727–30)
 Les Gémissements d’un cœur chrétien, exprimés dans les paroles du psaume CXVIII (1731)
 Recueil de lettres (2 volumes, 1734)
 De la solitude (1734)
 Explication de l’oraison dominicale (1738)
 L’Horloge de la passion, qui servoit de sujet de méditation aux Religieuses de Port-Royal pendant l’adoration du très-saint-Sacrement avec des oraisons tirées de M. Hamon, 1739
 Entretiens d’une âme avec Dieu... Avignon : aux dépens de la Société, 1740
 Abrégé de la vie de la révérende mère Marie-Angelique Arnauld, abbesse & réformatrice de Port-Royal, dans Entretiens ou conferences de la révérende mère Marie-Angélique Arnauld, abbesse & réformatrice de Port-Royal, 1757

17th-century French physicians
Jansenists
French academics
French medical writers
French religious writers
1618 births
1687 deaths
French male non-fiction writers
17th-century French male writers